Erika Anette Linder Jervemyr (born 11 May 1990) is a Swedish model and actress. She is known as an androgynous model for modeling both male and female clothing. In 2016, she starred in the film Below Her Mouth.

Early life
Linder was born in Sundbyberg, Stockholm County, Sweden.  She was scouted to be a model at a concert when she was 14 years old but declined the offer. She studied law in high school and language for one year at university, and played football until she was 19.

Career
In 2011, Linder portrayed a young Leonardo DiCaprio for the Candy magazine as her first modeling job. In subsequent years, Linder has modeled masculine, feminine and unisex looks for Tom Ford, Louis Vuitton and other houses and publications. In 2013, she appeared in the lyric video for Katy Perry's song "Unconditionally". In 2014, she played a male and a female part in an advertising campaign for Sweden's JC Jeans Company. In 2015, she appeared in the music video for the Of Monsters and Men song "Empire".

In 2016, Linder made her acting debut in the Canadian lesbian drama film Below Her Mouth in a starring role. In the movie, directed by April Mullen, she portrayed a lesbian woman working as a roofer in Canada.

Personal life
After starting her modeling career, Linder moved to Los Angeles. She is gay.

References

External links 

 

1990 births
Living people
Swedish female models
Swedish film actresses
21st-century Swedish actresses
Lesbian models
Swedish lesbian actresses
People from Sundbyberg Municipality
Next Management models